Mary Leslie may refer to:
 Mary Isabel Leslie, Irish nationalist and writer
 Mary Eliza Leslie, writer and Baptist missionary in colonial India
 Lady Mary Hamilton, née Leslie, Scottish novelist